Óscar Gutiérrez (born December 11, 1974), better known by his ring name Rey Mysterio, is an American professional wrestler. He is currently signed to WWE, where he performs on the SmackDown brand. Widely regarded as one of the greatest professional wrestlers of all time, he is credited for popularizing cruiserweight wrestling and is one of the world's most recognizable lucha libre wrestlers.

The nephew of Rey Misterio Sr., Mysterio began his professional wrestling career in 1989, at age 14, on the independent circuit, before signing with Asistencia Asesoría y Administración (AAA) in 1992. After a brief period performing for Extreme Championship Wrestling (ECW), Mysterio departed to World Championship Wrestling (WCW) in 1996. In WCW, Mysterio helped popularize lucha libre in the United States, which led to the rise of cruiserweight wrestling divisions, while he also won the WCW Cruiserweight Championship five times and the WCW World Tag Team Championship three times. He then wrestled for Consejo Mundial de Lucha Libre (CMLL), and joined World Wrestling Entertainment (WWE) in 2002.

In WWE, Mysterio won the Cruiserweight Championship three times, the World Heavyweight Championship, the Intercontinental Championship, and the United States Championship, all of them which he won twice, the WWE Championship once, and the Tag Team Championship four times.  Mysterio departed WWE in 2015, and appeared in New Japan Pro-Wrestling (NJPW) and AAA, before returning to WWE in 2018, winning the U.S. Championship twice and SmackDown Tag Team Championship once with his son Dominik.

All totaled, Mysterio has held 24 championships between WWE and WCW (including three world championships).  In addition, he is WWE's 21st Triple Crown and Grand Slam champion, is the 2006 Royal Rumble match winner, headlined several WWE pay-per-view events. He is an inductee in the WWE Hall of Fame Class of 2023.

Early life 
Óscar Gutiérrez was born on December 11, 1974 in Chula Vista, California, a suburb of San Diego. He still lives in Chula Vista.

Professional wrestling career

Early career (1989–1992) 
Gutiérrez made his debut in Mexico on April 30, 1989, when he was 14 years old. He was trained by his uncle Rey Misterio Sr. and wrestled early on in Mexico where he learned the Lucha Libre high flying style that has been his trademark. He had ring names such as "La Lagartija Verde (The Green Lizard)" and "Colibrí (Humming bird)" before his uncle gave him the name of Rey Misterio Jr. In 1991, Mysterio was awarded "Most Improved Wrestler" in Mexico while wrestling as Colibrí.

Asistencia Asesoría y Administración (1992–1995) 
In Asistencia Asesoría y Administración (AAA), Mysterio feuded with Juventud Guerrera. Mysterio's uncle Misterio Sr. also took on Guerrera in a tag match: Misterio Sr. and Mysterio Jr. facing Guerrera and his father Fuerza Guerrera.

Extreme Championship Wrestling (1995–1996) 
Mysterio signed with Paul Heyman's Extreme Championship Wrestling (ECW) in 1995. He debuted in September 1995 at Gangstas Paradise, defeating Psicosis, who was also making his ECW debut. A feud between the two began, which included a two out of three falls match and a Mexican Death match. Mysterio also had a series of matches with ECW-newcomer Juventud Guerrera during early 1996. He wrestled his final bout for ECW at Big Ass Extreme Bash in March 1996.

World Championship Wrestling

Cruiserweight division (1996–1998) 
Mysterio made his World Championship Wrestling (WCW) debut on June 16, 1996, at The Great American Bash, challenging Dean Malenko for the WCW Cruiserweight Championship in a losing effort. At Bash at the Beach on July 7, he defeated Psicosis in a #1 contender's match to earn another opportunity at the Cruiserweight title. The next night, on the July 8 episode of WCW Monday Nitro, he defeated Malenko to win his first Cruiserweight Championship. He reigned as champion for three months, which included title defenses against the likes of Ultimate Dragon at Hog Wild on August 10, Malenko, and Super Caló at Fall Brawl on September 15 before he lost the title to Malenko at Halloween Havoc on October 27. Mysterio challenged Ultimate Dragon for the J-Crown Championship in a losing effort at World War 3 on November 24.

In early 1997, he began a feud with Prince Iaukea over the WCW World Television Championship, culminating in a title match against Iaukea at SuperBrawl VII on February 23, which he lost after Lord Steven Regal attacked him. Mysterio also lost a title rematch at Uncensored on March 16. He defeated Ultimate Dragon at Spring Stampede on April 6, and Yuji Yasuraoka at Slamboree on May 18. Mysterio began a feud with the New World Order (nWo), which culminated when he lost a Mexican Death match to nWo member Konnan at Road Wild on August 9. Mysterio was then involved in a feud with his real-life friend and Cruiserweight Champion Eddie Guerrero, whom he defeated in a Title vs. Mask match at Halloween Havoc on October 26 to win the Cruiserweight Championship for the second time. On the November 10 episode of Nitro, he lost the title back to Guerrero, as well as in a rematch at World War 3 on November 23. On the January 15, 1998 episode of WCW Thunder, Mysterio defeated Juventud to win his third Cruiserweight Championship, but lost it nine days later to Chris Jericho at Souled Out. After the match, Jericho continued the beating by using a toolbox he found at ringside. This storyline was used to cover Mysterio's need for a knee operation that kept him out of the ring for six months. At Bash at the Beach on July 12, Mysterio returned and defeated Jericho for his fourth Cruiserweight championship. The next night, however, the result was overturned and the belt returned to Jericho due to Dean Malenko interfering.

Later that year, Eddie Guerrero formed a Mexican stable known as the Latino World Order (LWO) (a spin off of New World Order) that included nearly every luchador in the promotion. Mysterio continually refused to join and feuded with Guerrero and the LWO members, including winning a match against longtime rival and LWO member Psicosis in a match at Road Wild on August 8. He was forced to join the group after losing a match to Eddie Guerrero. Mysterio's on-and-off tag team partner Billy Kidman joined him during the feud with LWO, wrestling against the LWO despite Mysterio being a part of the group. Mysterio faced Kidman for the Cruiserweight Championship at Starrcade on December 27, but was unsuccessful in a triangle match also involving Juventud. On January 17, 1999, at Souled Out, Mysterio failed to win the title from Kidman in a fatal four-way match that also included Psicosis and Juventud.

Giant Killer and unmasking (1998–1999) 

After the two factions of nWo reformed, they demanded that the LWO disband. Mysterio refused to take off his LWO colors and was attacked by the nWo as a result. This led to a match at SuperBrawl IX on February 21, where Mysterio and tag partner Konnan lost a "Hair vs. Mask match" against Kevin Nash and Scott Hall, forcing Mysterio to remove his mask. After the match, he phoned his uncle to tell him the news. Mysterio has publicly expressed his disappointment over being unmasked:

Mysterio later became a "giant killer" by defeating large opponents such as Kevin Nash, Bam Bam Bigelow, and Scott Norton. At Uncensored on March 14, he lost to Nash after Lex Luger interfered and helped Nash win. The next night, on the March 15 episode of Nitro, he defeated Billy Kidman to win his fifth Cruiserweight Championship. On the March 22 episode of Nitro, Mysterio got his first shot at the WCW World Heavyweight Championship against champion Ric Flair when the names of (allegedly) nearly everyone in the company were put into a hat and a lottery was held. El Dandy was the lottery winner, but he was injured, and Mysterio took the shot instead. The match ended with a disqualification win for Flair, even though Arn Anderson's interference on Flair's behalf should have theoretically disqualified Flair. The following week, Mysterio and Kidman defeated Flair's Four Horsemen stablemates Chris Benoit and Dean Malenko to win the WCW World Tag Team Championship, making Mysterio a double champion. Mysterio successfully defended his Cruiserweight Championship against his tag team partner Kidman at Spring Stampede on April 11 before losing the title on the April 19 episode of Nitro to Psicosis in a fatal four-way match that also involved Juventud Guerrera and Blitzkrieg. On the following episode of Nitro, he defeated Psicosis to win his fifth Cruiserweight Championship. At Slamboree on May 9, Mysterio and Kidman lost the World Tag Team titles to Raven and Perry Saturn in a triangle match, also involving former champions Benoit and Malenko.

No Limit Soldiers and Filthy Animals (1999–2001) 

In mid-1999, Mysterio and Konnan joined Master P's No Limit Soldiers and feuded with The West Texas Rednecks. At The Great American Bash on June 13, they defeated Rednecks members Curt Hennig and Bobby Duncum Jr., and at Bash at the Beach on July 11, defeated the Rednecks in a four-on-four elimination tag team match. After Master P's departure from WCW, Mysterio formed a stable with Eddie Guerrero and Billy Kidman known as the Filthy Animals, turning heel for the first and only time in his career. The Filthy Animals soon began a feud with the Dead Pool, and defeated them in a six-man tag team match at Road Wild on August 14 and at Fall Brawl on September 12. On the August 19 episode of Thunder, Mysterio lost the cruiserweight title to Lenny Lane.

On the October 18 episode of Nitro, Mysterio and Konnan defeated Harlem Heat to win the World Tag Team Championship. Mysterio, however, was injured during the match and was sidelined as a result, Kidman substituted for Mysterio and teamed with Konnan during their title defense against Harlem Heat and The First Family, in which the Filthy Animals went on to lose the title back to Harlem Heat. Mysterio returned in early 2000 and remained a steady performer, eventually joining the New Blood faction in early 2000 opposing the Millionaire's Club. On the August 14 episode of Nitro, Mysterio and Juventud defeated The Great Muta and Vampiro to win the World Tag Team Championship. They were stripped of the title after Ernest Miller pinned Disco Inferno with the stipulation that if he pinned Disco, Mysterio and Guerrera would be stripped of the title. The Filthy Animals then feuded with The Natural Born Thrillers in the fall of the year. At Fall Brawl on September 17, the Filthy Animals fought the Thrillers to a no contest in an elimination tag team match. Mysterio reformed his tag team with Kidman and the two challenged for the World Tag Team Championship in a triangle match at Halloween Havoc on October 29, facing the champions Natural Born Thrillers and The Boogie Knights in a losing effort.

At Millennium Final on November 16, Mysterio and Kidman lost to KroniK, but avenged their loss at Mayhem ten days later, defeating KroniK and Alex Wright in a handicap match. At Starrcade on December 17, The Filthy Animals lost to The Harris Brothers and Jeff Jarrett in a Bunkhouse Brawl. After this, the Filthy Animals starting feuding with Team Canada, to whom they lost in a Penalty Box match at Sin on January 14, 2001. At SuperBrawl Revenge on February 19, Mysterio unsuccessfully challenged Chavo Guerrero Jr. for the Cruiserweight Championship. Kidman and Mysterio participated in a cruiserweight tag team tournament for the newly created WCW Cruiserweight Tag Team Championship and advanced to the final round where they ended up losing to Elix Skipper and Kid Romeo. On the final episode of Nitro on March 26, they defeated Skipper and Romeo in a rematch to win the Cruiserweight Tag Team Titles before WCW was sold to the World Wrestling Federation (WWF).

Consejo Mundial de Lucha Libre (2001–2002) 
After WCW closed down, Mysterio started wrestling independently in Mexico. He made his first ever Consejo Mundial de Lucha Libre appearance, debuting in an eight-man tag team match. Mysterio wrestled a total of 10 matches in CMLL before returning to the United States.

Independent circuit and Puerto Rico (2001–2002) 
Upon his return to the US, he worked in IWA Mid-South, the Xcitement Wrestling Federation and the Heartland Wrestling Association, with the likes of Eddie Guerrero and CM Punk. Mysterio traveled to Puerto Rico for the World Wrestling Council and wrestled Eddie (Primo) Colon over the WWC World Junior Heavyweight Championship in early 2002.

World Wrestling Entertainment / WWE

Championship reigns (2002–2004) 
In June 2002, Mysterio signed with World Wrestling Entertainment (WWE), and promos that hyped his debut began airing. The "Jr." was dropped from his name and was billed simply as Rey Mysterio.

Mysterio, with his mask, made his WWE debut on the July 25, 2002 episode of SmackDown! as a face, defeating Chavo Guerrero. He eventually began a feud with Kurt Angle, culminating in a match at SummerSlam on August 25, which Angle won after forcing Mysterio to submit to the ankle lock. He later formed a tag team with Edge; the two participated in a tournament for the newly created and SmackDown!-exclusive WWE Tag Team Championship. They lost to Kurt Angle and Chris Benoit in the finals of the tournament at No Mercy on October 20; the match was voted Match of the Year by the Wrestling Observer Newsletter. They won the titles when defeated Angle and Benoit in a two out of three falls match, but lost it to Los Guerreros in a Triple Threat Elimination match on November 17.

At WrestleMania XIX, he faced the cruiserweight Champion Matt Hardy for the title, but lost after Shannon Moore interfered. On the June 5 episode of SmackDown!, he defeated Hardy to win the title. After losing the championship to Tajiri on September 25, he regained it on January 1, 2004. After a successful title defense against Jamie Noble at the Royal Rumble on January 25, Mysterio lost the title to Chavo Guerrero at No Way Out on February 15. At WrestleMania XX on March 14, Mysterio took part in a Cruiserweight Open for the title, but Guerrero retained the title. On the June 17 episode of SmackDown!, he defeated Chavo Classic to win the title for a third time. He lost the title to Spike Dudley on the July 29 episode of SmackDown!.

Teaming and feuding with Eddie Guerrero (2004–2005) 
After an unsuccessful attempt at regaining the Cruiserweight Title, Mysterio formed a tag team with Rob Van Dam, and went on to win the WWE Tag Team Championship from Kenzo Suzuki and René Duprée on the December 9 episode of SmackDown!. They successfully defended the title against the former champions at Armageddon on December 12, before losing the title to the Basham Brothers on the January 13, 2005, episode of SmackDown! after Van Dam was injured.

Mysterio then teamed up with Eddie Guerrero to win the WWE Tag Team Championship back from the Bashams at No Way Out on February 20. In a departure from traditional booking, the new champions did not defend their title at WrestleMania 21 on April 3, but instead had a match against each other which Mysterio won. He once again defeated Guerrero at Judgment Day on May 22 by disqualification. At ECW One Night Stand on June 12, Mysterio faced and defeated long-time rival Psicosis for the first time in nearly five years.

The match at WrestleMania was part of a storyline in which Guerrero turned on Mysterio and beat him up after abandoning him during a match against MNM for the WWE Tag Team Championship. After a no disqualification match against Chavo, Eddie came out and slammed Mysterio on the steel steps, displaying Eddie's increasing frustration with being unable to defeat Mysterio. Guerrero and Mysterio continued to feud, with Guerrero threatening to reveal a secret he and Mysterio shared involving Mysterio's real life son Dominik, unless Mysterio deferred to Guerrero's authority. Guerrero later revealed that, in the storyline, he was Dominik's biological father. The storyline went that Guerrero knew Mysterio was having trouble starting his own family, so Guerrero left Dominik as a baby with Mysterio and his wife Angie to raise. Guerrero threatened to take custody of Dominik, drawing up custody papers and having his lawyer present them to Mysterio. At SummerSlam on August 21, Mysterio defeated Guerrero in a ladder match for the custody of Dominik. On November 13, 2005, Eddie Guerrero was found dead in his hotel room in Minneapolis, Minnesota. That same day at a WWE "Super Show" where SmackDown! and Raw were both taped, Mysterio gave an emotional speech about Guerrero, and in a show of respect removed his mask (though he put his head down, so his face could not be seen). Mysterio went on to defeat Shawn Michaels in an interbrand match later that night. After the match, Michaels and Mysterio hugged in the ring and Mysterio pointed up to the sky, crying, in memory of Guerrero.

World Heavyweight Champion (2005–2007) 
Mysterio participated in the main event of Survivor Series on November 27 as part of Team SmackDown! along with Randy Orton, Bobby Lashley, Batista, and John "Bradshaw" Layfield (JBL) who defeated Team Raw (Shawn Michaels, Kane, Big Show, Carlito, and Chris Masters). Mysterio then started a feud with Big Show after Mysterio eliminated Big Show at Survivor Series. Mysterio would face Big Show in a match billed as "David vs. Goliath" in a SmackDown! special show, and ended as a "no contest" when Big Show's tag team partner Kane interfered in the match. Mysterio continued to feud with Raw's World Tag Team Champions, and found a tag team partner in World Heavyweight Champion Batista. They were booked to face Raw's Kane and Big Show in a tag match at Armageddon on December 18. Before Armageddon, Batista and Mysterio defeated MNM on the December 16 episode of SmackDown! to win the WWE Tag Team Championship in a match they both dedicated to Eddie Guerrero. Mysterio and Batista's match with Big Show and Kane was then billed as "Champions vs. Champions," which they lost. On the December 30 episode of SmackDown!, MNM invoked their rematch clause, defeating Batista and Mysterio after interference from Mark Henry to regain the WWE Tag Team Championship. The following week, Mysterio and Batista received their rematch for the titles in a steel cage match, which they lost after interference by Henry. On the January 13 episode of SmackDown!, Mysterio was involved in a 20-man battle royal for the vacant World Heavyweight Championship, but was eliminated by Henry.

Mysterio was the second entrant in the Royal Rumble match on January 29, 2006, setting a record by lasting 62 minutes, winning the match, and earning a world title shot by last eliminating Randy Orton. Orton urged him to put the title shot at stake in a match at No Way Out. Over the following weeks, Orton made disparaging remarks about Eddie Guerrero, which many felt the comments were unwarranted and distasteful in the wake of Guerrero's death. Orton won at No Way Out on February 19, earning Mysterio's title shot for the World Heavyweight Championship at WrestleMania 22 on April 2. General Manager Theodore Long re-added Mysterio to the WrestleMania title match however, making it a triple threat match between Orton, Mysterio, and then-champion, Kurt Angle. At WrestleMania, Mysterio pinned Orton to become the new World Heavyweight Champion. On the following episode of SmackDown!, Mysterio –  billed as an "underdog champion", made his first successful World Heavyweight title defense against Orton. Mysterio retained the title again during a WrestleMania rematch on SmackDown! against Angle three weeks later.

Mysterio quickly moved into a feud with the United States Champion John "Bradshaw" Layfield (JBL). The rivalry kicked off after JBL, celebrating his United States Championship win, stated he deserved the World Heavyweight title. This feud saw Mysterio face off against three opponents chosen by JBL in the three weeks leading up to their title match at Judgment Day. Mysterio was defeated by Mark Henry and The Great Khali in separate non-title matches before wrestling Kane to a "no contest"; Mysterio retained his title against JBL at Judgment Day on May 21. The feud intensified when JBL lost the United States Championship to Bobby Lashley five days later on SmackDown! after being tricked by Mysterio to take on all comers like Mysterio himself had. JBL vowed that if he did not win his rematch against Mysterio, he would quit SmackDown!. In their main event match, Mysterio retained the World Heavyweight Championship, causing JBL to leave SmackDown!, until ECW One Night Stand, when he announced his return as a color commentator. Mysterio was booked to defend against ECW wrestler Sabu at One Night Stand. In the weeks leading up to his title defense, Mysterio defeated Cruiserweight Champion Gregory Helms in a Champion vs. Champion match, and lost to Rob Van Dam at WWE vs. ECW Head-to-Head on June 7. At One Night Stand on June 11, Mysterio retained the title, after he and Sabu were ruled unable to continue following a triple jump DDT through a table by Sabu. Mysterio then retained his title in a match against Mark Henry, winning by disqualification after Chavo Guerrero handed Henry a chair and Mysterio acted as if he was hit, a tactic for which Eddie Guerrero was known.

Mysterio began a feud with King Booker after Booker won a battle royal to become the number one contender for the World Heavyweight Championship. Booker attacked Mysterio from behind backstage with the help of Booker's wife Queen Sharmell. The next week on SmackDown!, Mysterio gained revenge by attacking Booker and his "court". This rivalry continued for several weeks and saw Mysterio defeating Booker's court member William Regal on an episode of SmackDown!, moments before attacking the challenger and hitting him with a 619 around the steel post. On July 23 at The Great American Bash, Mysterio lost the World Heavyweight Championship to King Booker after Chavo interfered in the match and turned on Mysterio, hitting him with a steel chair. Guerrero cost Mysterio his rematch the following week. This culminated in a match at SummerSlam on August 20, where Mysterio lost to Guerrero after Vickie Guerrero tried to stop both men from fighting, but accidentally knocked Mysterio off the top turnbuckle. Vickie then along with Chavo turned on Mysterio after she hit him in the back with a steel chair and gave him an injury, thus, siding with Guerrero. Mysterio then defeated Guerrero in a Falls Count Anywhere match at No Mercy on October 8. Subsequently, Guerrero challenged Mysterio to an "I quit" match for the October 20 edition of SmackDown!. In that match (which Mysterio lost), Guerrero injured Mysterio's knee, using the match to write Mysterio out of the storyline for a while to get knee surgery.

Mysterio made his in-ring return at SummerSlam on August 26, 2007, defeating Guerrero, after Guerrero obsessed over Mysterio's return as well as wanting to injure Mysterio again. On the August 31 episode of SmackDown!, Mysterio won a "Championship Competition" to become the number one contender for the World Heavyweight Championship, defeating Batista and Finlay. On the September 7 episode of SmackDown!, Mysterio had an "I Quit" match with Guerrero, which he won after hitting Guerrero's knee with a steel chair repeatedly in a similar manner to which Mysterio had been put out of action, to end the feud. Mysterio then began a feud with The Great Khali, which led to a World Heavyweight Championship match at Unforgiven on September 16. The match was later made a Triple Threat match, also involving Batista, who won it.

Various storylines (2007–2009) 
Mysterio then began a feud with Finlay, an opponent chosen by JBL. The rivalry was marked as "Fight vs. Flight", contrasting the fighting styles of both wrestlers – Finlay's physicality, versus the high-flying Mysterio. After fighting to a "no contest" at No Mercy on October 7, followed by a double-disqualification in a number one contender's match for Batista's World Heavyweight Championship on the next SmackDown! he defeated Finlay in a Stretcher match at Cyber Sunday on October 28. During this feud, he lost a match to Finlay on the November 9 episode of SmackDown! and was part of the winning team at Survivor Series on November 18 which consisted of both wrestlers on opposing sides (although Mysterio was second to be eliminated).

He re-entered the World Heavyweight Championship picture on the January 4, 2008 episode of SmackDown! when he won a Beat the Clock challenge for a chance to face the World Heavyweight Champion Edge at the Royal Rumble. He was unsuccessful in winning the championship at the event on January 27. WWE's official website announced on February 14 that Mysterio suffered a biceps injury during an overseas tour. Despite the injury, Mysterio faced Edge for the title in a rematch at No Way Out on February 17, which he lost. On the February 22 episode of SmackDown, Mysterio announced that his injury would keep him out of action for at least six months, and he eventually underwent three surgeries within the space of a month.

Mysterio made his return on the June 23, 2008, episode of Raw, as the first wrestler to be drafted in the 2008 WWE Draft from the SmackDown brand to the Raw brand. Mysterio made his Raw in-ring debut on July 7, pinning Santino Marella after a 619. General Manager Mike Adamle announced that John Cena was injured and that Mysterio would replace him in the Championship Scramble at Unforgiven. The next week, Mysterio made his return to Raw after an extended absence by attacking Kane, turning back numerous claims that Kane had "ended his career". Mysterio then made his in-ring return at Unforgiven on September 7, competing in the World Heavyweight Championship scramble match, which was won by Chris Jericho. Mysterio put his mask on the line in a match at No Mercy on October 5, which he won by disqualification after Kane attacked him with a steel chair. He defeated Kane again at Cyber Sunday on October 26, this time in a No Holds Barred match, and again at Survivor Series on November 23, when the pair were on opposing sides in a five-on-five elimination match. At No Way Out on February 15, 2009, Mysterio competed in the Elimination Chamber match for the World Heavyweight Championship, but was eliminated by Edge when the two were the last men in the match.

Intercontinental Champion (2009–2010) 
At WrestleMania 25, Mysterio defeated John "Bradshaw" Layfield (JBL) for the Intercontinental Championship in 21 seconds. His win made Mysterio the twenty-first Triple Crown Champion in WWE history. Mysterio was drafted back to the SmackDown brand during the 2009 WWE Draft on the April 13 episode of Raw, in the process making the Intercontinental Championship exclusive to SmackDown for the first time since August 2002. He then entered into an extensive feud with Chris Jericho, retaining his title against him at Judgment Day on May 17. During their second match at Extreme Rules, Jericho won after he unmasked Mysterio and pinned him, losing the title. Mysterio and Jericho were booked in a Title vs. Mask match that was scheduled for The Bash on June 28, which Mysterio won, regaining the title. He then moved into a feud with Dolph Ziggler, whom he retained the title against at both Night of Champions and SummerSlam. On August 2, WWE announced that Mysterio would be suspended for 30 days, effective September 2, for violating the company's Wellness Policy. Before the suspension, he lost the title on September 1 (aired September 4) against John Morrison. In an interview with Mexican newspaper Record, Mysterio stated that he was suspended for a drug he was using for his knee and arm. Mysterio stated that he had a prescription for the drug, but was unable to produce it in time to prevent his suspension due to being on vacation and doing a promotional tour.

When he returned, Mysterio began a storyline with Batista. They lost to Jeri-Show (Chris Jericho and Big Show) in a match for the Unified WWE Tag Team Championship at Hell in a Cell. At Bragging Rights, they participated in a Fatal 4 Way match for the World Heavyweight Championship. During the match, Mysterio prevented Batista of winning the title and, after the match Batista attacked Mysterio. Batista defeated Mysterio at Survivor Series. Their feud moved around the World Heavyweight Championship, when Mysterio defeated Batista on the December 18 episode of SmackDown to gain a title shot against The Undertaker on the December 25 episode of SmackDown, but the match for the title ended in a no contest after Batista interfered. On the January 15 episode of SmackDown, they faced again in a number one contender's match in a Steel Cage match, where Mysterio won. However, Mysterio lost the title match to The Undertaker at the Royal Rumble.

Since February, Mysterio began a feud with CM Punk that also involved Punk's Straight Edge Society. During the Elimination Chamber match, Mysterio eliminated Punk. Mysterio continued to feud with Punk and had a match at WrestleMania XXVI with the stipulation that if Mysterio were to lose at WrestleMania, he would be forced to join the SES. After Mysterio defeated Punk at WrestleMania, they faced again at Extreme Rules with Mysterio losing to Punk in a match where Punk should have had his head shaved if he lost. At Over the Limit on May 23, Mysterio faced CM Punk again with both previous stipulations in place (Mysterio's allegiance to the SES and Punk's hair); Mysterio defeated Punk, resulting in Punk's head being shaved.

World championship reigns (2010–2011) 

At Fatal 4-Way, Mysterio defeated Jack Swagger, Big Show, and CM Punk to win the World Heavyweight Championship for the second time. He only retained the title for 28 days, losing it at Money in the Bank against Kane, who had won the SmackDown Money in the Bank ladder match earlier that night. He had the rematch for the title at SummerSlam, but he was defeated.

Between August 2010 and January 2011, Mysterio had a feud with the debuting Alberto Del Rio, a Mexican wrestler who portrayed a high-class aristocrat. During Del Rio's debut on the August 20 episode of SmackDown, Mysterio lost to him by submission. They both participated at Bragging Rights as part of victorious Team SmackDown, but during the match Del Rio attacked Mysterio. At Survivor Series on November 21, Mysterio and Del Rio led two oposing teams as part of the traditional Survivor Series match, where Team Mysterio won. They also participated at TLC: Tables, Ladders & Chairs in a fatal four-way Tables, Ladders, and Chairs match for the World Heavyweight Championship, won by Edge. His feud with Del Rio culminated on the January 7, 2011, episode of SmackDown in a two out of three falls match, which Del Rio won by countout.

Mysterio's next feud was against Cody Rhodes. On the January 21 episode of SmackDown, during a match against Cody Rhodes, Mysterio accidentally broke his nose when he hit him with a 619. WWE used this accident to start a feud and, as part of the storyline, Rhodes began to wear a mask and they wrestled at WrestleMania XXVII, where Mysterio lost to Rhodes. At Extreme Rules on May 1, Mysterio defeated Rhodes in a Falls Count Anywhere match to end the feud.

In the 2011 WWE Draft, Mysterio was drafted to the Raw brand. In May, Mysterio started feuding with CM Punk, with the pair exchanging victories on consecutive episodes of Raw. The feud culminated in a singles match on June 19 at Capitol Punishment, where Punk emerged victorious. On July 25, Mysterio won a tournament for the vacant WWE Championship to win his first WWE Championship, but he lost the title to John Cena later that night. On the August 15 episode of Raw, Mysterio received a rematch for the WWE Championship against new champion Alberto Del Rio, but lost via submission. Mysterio suffered an injury in late August.

Teaming with Sin Cara (2012–2013) 
On April 26, 2012, WWE reported that Mysterio had been suspended for 60 days due to his second violation of the company's Talent Wellness Program policy and that his suspension would expire on June 25. After his return on the July 16 episode of Raw, Mysterio had two matches at SummerSlam and Night Of Champions for the Intercontinental Championship held by The Miz, but he was defeated both times. Since September 2012, he was paired with Sin Cara, working as a tag team.  Despite working for 3 months, Mysterio took the decision to leave WWE when he saw no creative direction about his tag team with Sin Cara. The team dissolved in December since Mysterio was taking time off and Sin Cara underwent knee surgery. To write him off television, the storyline was that The Shield attacked them and Mysterio suffered an injury. In March, Mysterio took another leave of absence due to a legitimate knee injury, explained in storyline as an attack by Mark Henry.

Final storylines and departure (2013–2015) 

After eight months, Mysterio returned at a WWE live event on October 17, 2013, and returned to television as part of the Spanish commentary team at Hell in a Cell on October 27. On the November 18 episode of Raw, Mysterio saved CM Punk and Daniel Bryan from an attack by The Wyatt Family and The Real Americans (Jack Swagger and Antonio Cesaro), which led to Mysterio being part of a 10-man elimination tag team match at Survivor Series on November 24, in which Mysterio's team lost after he was eliminated by sole survivor Roman Reigns. At TLC: Tables, Ladders and Chairs on December 15, Mysterio and Big Show unsuccessfully challenged Cody Rhodes and Goldust for the WWE Tag Team Championship in a fatal four-way match also involving RybAxel (Ryback and Curtis Axel) and The Real Americans. At WrestleMania XXX on April 6, 2014 Mysterio competed in the André the Giant Memorial Battle Royal but was eliminated by Cesaro.

On the April 7 episode of Raw, he made an appearance and lost to a returning Bad News Barrett, subsequently deciding to take time off to heal a wrist injury. During his hiatus, it was reported that Mysterio wanted to leave WWE, but the promotion had extended his contract without his approval. Mysterio did not return to WWE programming, and instead appeared in a video message at AAA's Triplemanía XXII and also visited Lucha Underground. On February 26, 2015, WWE officially announced that Mysterio's WWE contract had expired, ending his nearly 13-year tenure with the company.

Return to AAA (2015–2016)
On March 3, 2015, five days after being released from WWE, it was announced that Mysterio had agreed to work for Lucha Libre AAA Worldwide for the first time since 1995. He made his in-ring return as part of AAA's 2015 pay-per-view Rey de Reyes ("King of Kings") on March 18, 2015. Mysterio teamed up with Myzteziz (formerly Sin Cara in WWE) to defeat the Los Perros del Mal team of El Hijo del Perro Aguayo and Pentagón Jr., with Mysterio scoring the winning pin. This match is notorious for showing wrestler Perro Aguayo Jr.'s death in the ring following a drop kick from Mysterio. Mysterio delivered a dropkick to Perro's back, causing him to fall to the second rope, setting him up for Mysterio's signature "619" wrestling move, which involve Mysterio running towards the rope, grabbing it, and spinning around 180°, hitting the person on the face with his legs. Mysterio, seeing that something was wrong due to Perro becoming limp, purposely missed. The other wrestlers continued performing while each coming up and checking on Perro. They quickly finished the match after realizing that something serious had happened. The ref, wrestlers, and lockerroom crew came out and took Perro out using a piece of plywood. He was pronounced dead by the doctors later that night. His official death was ruled as cardiac arrest.

On May 24, 2015, Mysterio came together with Myzteziz and El Patrón Alberto to form the "Dream Team" for AAA's Lucha Libre World Cup. The trio eventually won the tournament, defeating Johnny Mundo, Matt Hardy and Mr. Anderson in the finals with Mysterio pinning Mundo for the win. For Triplemanía XXIII, AAA's biggest show of the year, a "dream match" between Mysterio and Myzteziz took place. Both wrestlers teamed during their time in WWE and AAA but had never competed against each other. Mysterio was victorious, forcing Myzteziz to submit to a Fujiwara armbar. After the match, Myzteziz turned rudo and sprayed mist at Mysterio's face and challenged him to a Lucha de Apuestas. In early February 2016, AAA announced that Mysterio had left AAA due to financial issues between Mysterio and AAA. Despite not working directly for AAA, Mysterio Jr. participated in the 2016 Lucha Libre World Cup alongside Dr. Wagner Jr. and Dragon Azteca Jr., known as "Team Mexico International" the trio finished in third place.

Return to independent circuit (2015–2018)
Mysterio has also appeared on a number of independent shows, facing Amazing Red in House of Glory, Ricochet in Drive Wrestling, P. J. Black in Black Destiny Wrestling, AJ Styles at a 5 Star Wrestling show in the UK, Alberto El Patron in Qatar Pro Wrestling, amongst others.

Mysterio faced fellow WWE alumnus Kurt Angle on March 20, 2016 for the upstart URFight promotion. Mysterio successfully defeated Angle in a two-falls match with assistance from rapper Riff Raff. In January 2017, Mysterio noted in an interview that he may consider opening up his own wrestling school. During the interview, he said: "I just thought I would never have the time. Now being able to make that time – to not have the busy schedule I had with WWE – gives me plenty of time to be a family man. I'm hoping that this time I'm spending with my son will open up that idea again and create a Rey Mysterio Wrestling school". On April 30, 2017, at the WCPW Pro Wrestling World Cup – Mexican Qualifying Round, Mysterio won the Mexico Leg with Penta El Zero M defeating Alberto El Patron in the semi-finals, and defeating longtime rival Juventud Guerrera in the finals. In Round 16, Mysterio lost to the English qualifier Will Ospreay.

Rey Mysterio teamed up with Mexican luchadors Fenix and Bandido for the main event of the indy super show All In on September 1, 2018, losing to The Golden Elite team of Kota Ibushi and The Young Bucks (Nick and Matt Jackson).

Lucha Underground (2015–2018) 
Mysterio signed with Lucha Underground on December 12, 2015 and appeared on the second season. On January 10, 2016, Mysterio teamed with Dragon Azteca Jr. and Prince Puma to defeat Ivelisse, Johnny Mundo and Son of Havoc and Fénix, Jack Evans, and P. J. Black and Cortez Castro, Joey Ryan and Mr. Cisco in a 4-way Trio Tag Team Elimination Match for the Lucha Underground Trios Championship. Mysterio was the second competitor to enter the second ever Aztec Warfare match and was the final elimination by the eventual winner Matanza. On January 31, 2016, at Ultima Lucha Dos, Rey Mysterio defeated Prince Puma. On April 9, 2016 Mysterio was in an Aztec Warfare match where he eliminated Matanza Cueto after Mysterio was eliminated by Johnny Mundo.

During an interview with Title Match Wrestling in December 2016, Mysterio was asked if he would ever return to WWE, Mysterio replied:
"You never say never. But I am very, very comfortable in the position I'm in with Lucha Underground. I love their schedule, I love their style, I love what they have to offer. I don't think there will ever be another company that has what Lucha Underground has. It's very unique, exciting, and fresh—this is really something new".

At the end of Season 3, Mysterio was seen locked inside a cell with Matanza Cueto, implying that he had been killed off and would not be returning for Season 4. It was confirmed that Mysterio would not return for Season 4 as he had chosen not to renew his contract with Lucha Underground.

New Japan Pro-Wrestling (2018) 
Rey Mysterio made his New Japan Pro-Wrestling (NJPW) debut on June 9, 2018 as part of NJPW's Dominion 6.9 in Osaka-jo Hall show. Mysterio teamed up with Jushin Thunder Liger and Hiroshi Tanahashi, losing to the Bullet Club team of Cody, Marty Scurll and Adam Page.

Second return to AAA (2018) 
On June 3, 2018, Mysterio returned to Lucha Libre AAA Worldwide (AAA) at Verano de Escándalo, competing in a three-way match for the AAA Mega Championship against Rey Wegner and Jeff Jarrett, with Jarrett winning.

Return to WWE

United States Champion (2018–2020)
In 2018, Mysterio made two surprise appearances at Royal Rumble and Greatest Royal Rumble, but he didn't win the matches. On September 19, it was confirmed Mysterio had signed a two-year contract with WWE.

He participated in the WWE World Cup, but was defeated in the semi-finals by The Miz at Crown Jewel. Two nights later on SmackDown Live, Mysterio was attacked by Randy Orton, where he ripped Mysterio's mask off of his face. The two fought the following week, with Orton getting the upper-hand. At Starrcade on November 25, Mysterio faced Shinsuke Nakamura for the Intercontinental Championship and won the match by disqualification, but not the title; he then teamed with Rusev to defeat Nakamura and The Miz. At TLC: Tables, Ladders & Chairs on December 16, Mysterio defeated Orton in a Chairs match, ending their feud. On January 27, 2019, at the Royal Rumble, Mysterio entered at #25, but was eliminated by Orton.

From February to May, Mysterio had several matches for Samoa Joe's United States Championship. He failed to win it at Fastlane and WrestleMania 35. After being drafted to Raw as part of the Superstar Shake-up, Mysterio won the title at Money in the Bank, becoming the twenty-first WWE Grand Slam Champion in the process. However, on the June 3 episode of Raw, Mysterio announced that he would return the title to Joe due to suffering an injury. Mysterio returned from injury one month later.

On the September 23 episode of Raw, Mysterio won a fatal five-way elimination match, which led to Mysterio earning a Universal Championship opportunity against Seth Rollins. However, the following week on Raw, Mysterio and Dominik were brutally attacked by Brock Lesnar, resulting in a storyline injury for the latter. On the October 4 episode of SmackDown, Mysterio assisted the debut of Cain Velasquez to attack Lesnar after the latter's WWE Championship win. At Crown Jewel on October 31, Lesnar defeated Velasquez by submission and continued to apply the Kimura Lock after the match had concluded until Mysterio attacked Lesnar with a chair. On the following week, Lesnar quit SmackDown to move to Raw in order to seek revenge against Mysterio, who had been drafted to Raw. At Survivor Series on November 24, Mysterio lost to Lesnar despite interference from Dominik.

Mysterio regained the United States Championship on the November 25 episode of Raw, when he defeated A.J. Styles, but 31 days later lost it during a house show at Madison Square Garden to Andrade. He then attempted to win the title back on the January 6, 2020 and January 20 episodes of Raw, but Andrade successfully retained the title.

Teaming with Dominik Mysterio (2020–2022) 

On the April 20 episode of Raw, Mysterio defeated Murphy to qualify for the Money in the Bank ladder match. At Money in the Bank on May 10, Mysterio failed to win the match. On the following episode of Raw, Mysterio and Aleister Black fought Seth Rollins and Murphy to a disqualification when Rollins pulled Mysterio off of the ring apron and used the corner of the steel steps to pierce Mysterio's eye, taking him out of action. This resulted in speculation that Mysterio would "retire", following weeks of being mocked by Rollins. However, Mysterio and Dominik later began targeting Rollins, with Mysterio challenging Rollins to an Eye for an Eye match at The Horror Show at Extreme Rules; the match could be won by "removing" an opponent's eyeball. At the event on July 19, Mysterio lost the match in a gruesome manner, but doctors believed his eye was able to be saved. At Payback on August 30, Mysterio and his son Dominik Mysterio defeated Rollins and Murphy. As part of the 2020 Draft, Mysterio was drafted to the SmackDown brand. Mysterio and Rollins faced each other in a No Holds Barred Final Chapter match on the November 13 episode of SmackDown, which Mysterio won after assistance from Murphy, who turned on Rollins. At Survivor Series on November 22, Rey and Dominik would both compete in a dual brand battle royal, but both men were eliminated. On January 26, at Superstar Spectacle, Mysterio, Ricochet, Dilsher Shanky and Giant Zanjeer defeated Cesaro, Dolph Ziggler, King Corbin, and Shinsuke Nakamura. At Royal Rumble on January 31, 2021, Mysterio entered at #26, but would be eliminated by Omos.

Soon after the Royal Rumble, Mysterio started teaming up with Dominik, and on the WrestleMania edition of SmackDown on April 9, they faced The Street Profits, Otis and Chad Gable, and the champions Dolph Ziggler and Robert Roode for the SmackDown Tag Team Championship in a losing effort as the champions retained. At WrestleMania Backlash on May 16, Mysterio and Dominik defeated Ziggler and Roode to win the SmackDown Tag Team Championship, becoming the first ever father-son tag team champions in WWE history. On the June 4 episode of SmackDown, the Mysterios retained their titles against The Usos, albeit with controversy as Jimmy's shoulder was lifted although the referee wasn't aware. After Adam Pearce and Sonya Deville granted a rematch later that same night, the Mysterios again retained their titles after Roman Reigns interfered and attacked the Mysterios, causing a disqualification, and both were assaulted by Reigns afterwards. The following week on SmackDown, Rey called out Reigns for attacking Dominik, and challenged Reigns to a Hell in a Cell match at the namesake pay-per-view on June 20, but before Reigns could answer, Rey attacked Reigns with a kendo stick, but was ultimately overpowered, and while Dominik joined the brawl, Reigns powerbombed Dominik over the top rope and out of the ring. The next day on Talking Smack, Paul Heyman, Reigns' "special council", formally accepted Rey's challenge on Reigns's behalf. On June 17, however, Rey posted to Twitter, stating that he did not want to wait until Sunday, and it was announced that the match would instead take place on the June 18 episode of SmackDown, marking the first Hell in a Cell match to take place on SmackDown, in which was defeated by Reigns. At Money in the Bank on July 18, The Mysterios lost the titles to The Usos in the pre-show, ending their reign at 63 days. At SummerSlam on August 21, The Mysterios failed to win the titles from the Usos in a rematch.

As part of the 2021 Draft, both Rey and Dominik were drafted to the Raw brand. In October, Mysterio entered the King of the Ring tournament, where he lost to Sami Zayn in the first round. On the October 25 episode of Raw, Mysterio competed in a fatal four-way ladder match to determine the #1 contender for the WWE Championship, which was won by Seth Rollins and featured Kevin Owens and Finn Bálor. At Royal Rumble on January 29, 2022, Rey entered at #23 but was eliminated by Otis. On the following episode of Raw, Mysterio lost to AJ Styles in an Elimination Chamber qualifying match. Around this time, Rey, along with Dominik, were involved in a feud with The Miz. At Elimination Chamber on February 19, Mysterio defeated Miz in the pre-show. On the first night of WrestleMania on April 2, The Mysterios lost a tag team match to Miz and social media star Logan Paul. On the June 27 episode of Raw, Mysterio competed in a Money in the Bank qualifying battle royal, which was won by Riddle.

Feud with The Judgment Day (2022–present) 
In the following weeks, The Mysterios began a feud with The Judgment Day (Finn Balor, Damian Priest, and Rhea Ripley), who repeatedly attempted to have Dominik join the stable. At SummerSlam on July 30, the Mysterios defeated Bálor and Priest in a no disqualification match due to interference from a returning Edge, the Judgment Day's former leader. On the following episode of Raw, they faced The Usos for the Undisputed WWE Tag Team Championship in a losing effort. At Clash at the Castle on September 3, Rey teamed with Edge to defeat Bálor and Priest, and after the match, Dominik hit Edge with a low blow and hit a clothesline on Rey, thus disbanding the Mysterios. On the October 14 episode of SmackDown, he was transferred to the SmackDown brand. 

On Thanksgiving, Rey was attacked by Dominik and Ripley after Rey refused to let them into the house. On Christmas Eve, Dominik and Ripley visited Rey's parent's home. A confrontation ensued between Dominik, Ripley, Rey and Angie (Rey's wife and Dominik's mother) outside of the house with Dominik shoving Rey and Angie slapping Ripley. The police arrived shortly after and (kayfabe) arrested Dominik. 
At the Royal Rumble on January 28, 2023, Rey was scheduled to enter the Royal Rumble match at #17, but was unable to compete due to presumably being attacked either solely by Dominik, who entered the match at #18 or the entire The Judgment Day. On Valentine's Day, Dominik and Ripley intruded on Rey's and Angie's Valentine's Day dinner, where the latter party immediately gave way to the former. At the end of the dinner, Dominik fled the restaurant after two police officers entered the premise thinking there was a sting operation on him as "[he was] the most wanted man on TikTok." Ripley was left to pick up the bill before leaving.

On March 10, WWE announced that Mysterio would be inducted into the WWE Hall of Fame as a part of the Class of 2023.

Other media 
Mysterio has been a subject of several DVDs during his wrestling career, including Rey Mysterio: 619, a 2003 documentary of Mysterio's career and personal life. WWE also produced Rey Mysterio: The Biggest Little Man, a three disc set featuring Mysterio's best matches that was released on October 23, 2007. He was also featured on the DVD Before They Were Wrestling Stars: Rey Mysterio Jr. in 2007 which featured matches from his time in Mexico. Rey Mysterio: The Life of a Masked Man was issued on July 12, 2011. In the UK, Silver Vision released a Mysterio DVD as part of their Best of WWE collection. This featured his matches from SummerSlam 2005, WrestleMania 22, No Mercy 2006, and SummerSlam 2007.

Movies
Mysterio appeared in the 2000 film Ready to Rumble along with several other wrestlers.

Books

Music 
Mysterio, along with rapper Mad One, performed the original version of "Booyaka 619", which Mysterio used as his WWE entrance theme around September 2005. Mysterio also performed a rap song, called "Crossing Borders", which appears on the album WWE Originals and was also used as the official theme song for the 2004 No Way Out pay-per-view.

Video games

Personal life 
Gutierrez and his wife Angie have two children: a son, Dominik (born April 5, 1997) and a daughter, Aalyah (born August 20, 2001). He has tattoos of his children's names on his right and left biceps, tattoos dedicated to his wife, Angie, and a tattoo with the initials EG for his best friend and fellow wrestler, Eddie Guerrero, who died in 2005. He is a devout Catholic, frequently crossing himself before his matches and bearing numerous religious tattoos on his body, most notably a cross on his chest attached to rosaries as well as other crosses and allusions to God.

Gutiérrez is part of an extended family of wrestlers, including his son Dominik Gutiérrez, uncle Rey Misterio Sr. and his cousins El Hijo de Rey Misterio and Metalika.

On March 19, 2007, Sports Illustrated posted on its website an article in its continuing series investigating a steroid and HGH ring used by a number of professional athletes in several sports. That article mentioned several current and former WWE wrestlers, including Gutierrez who was alleged to have obtained nandrolone and stanozolol. WWE subsequently stated that the allegations preceded the Talent Wellness program WWE launched in February 2006. On August 27, 2009, WWE announced that Gutierrez would receive a 30-day suspension due to a violation of the wellness program. Days later Gutierrez defended himself in a newspaper interview by explaining the drugs as being on a prescription for his knee and arm. While the Wellness Policy allows for prescribed drugs, Gutierrez further contested he had been on a family holiday and subsequently in Europe promoting SummerSlam, giving him only a day to provide the prescription after being notified. On April 26, 2012, WWE suspended Gutierrez for 60 days due to a second violation of their wellness program.

Filmography

Television

Championships and accomplishments 

 Asistencia Asesoría y Administración / Lucha Libre AAA Worldwide
 Mexican National Trios Championship (1 time) – with Octagón and Super Muñeco
 Mexican National Welterweight Championship (1 time)
 Lucha Libre World Cup (2015) – with Myzteziz and El Patrón Alberto
 AAA Hall of Fame (Class of 2007)
 Técnico of the Year (2015)
 Catch Wrestling Europe
 CWE World Grand Prix (2017)
Cauliflower Alley Club
Lucha Libre Award (2020)
 The Crash
 The Crash Heavyweight Championship (1 time)
 DDT Pro-Wrestling
 Ironman Heavymetalweight Championship (1 time)
 Destiny World Wrestling
 DWW Championship (1 time)
 Hollywood Heavyweight Wrestling
 HHW Light Heavyweight Championship (1 time)
 International Wrestling All-Stars
 IWAS Tag Team Championship (1 time) – with Konnan
 Lucha Underground
 Lucha Underground Trios Championship (1 time) – with Dragon Azteca Jr. and Prince Puma
 Pro Wrestling Illustrated
 Ranked No. 4 of the top 500 best singles wrestlers in the PWI 500 in 1999
 Ranked No. 56 of the top 500 singles wrestlers of the "PWI Years" in 2003
 World Championship Wrestling
 WCW Cruiserweight Championship (5 times)
 WCW Cruiserweight Tag Team Championship (1 time) – with Billy Kidman
 WCW World Tag Team Championship (3 times) – with Billy Kidman (1), Konnan (1), and Juventud Guerrera (1)
 World Wrestling Association
 WWA Lightweight Championship (3 times)
 WWA Tag Team Championship (1 time) – with Rey Misterio
 WWA Welterweight Championship (3 times)
 World Wrestling Council
 WWC World Junior Heavyweight Championship (1 time)
 World Wrestling Entertainment/WWE
 WWE Championship (1 time)
 World Heavyweight Championship (2 times)
 WWE Cruiserweight Championship (3 times)
 WWE Intercontinental Championship (2 times)
 WWE Tag Team Championship (4 times) – with Edge (1), Rob Van Dam (1), Eddie Guerrero (1), and Batista (1)
 WWE SmackDown Tag Team Championship (1 time) – with Dominik Mysterio
 WWE United States Championship (2 times)
 Royal Rumble (2006)
 WWE Hall of Fame (2023)
Championship Competition Tournament (2007)
 Bragging Rights Trophy (2010) – with Team SmackDown (Big Show, Jack Swagger, Alberto Del Rio, Edge, Tyler Reks and Kofi Kingston)
WWE Championship Tournament (2011)
 21st Triple Crown Champion
 21st Grand Slam Champion
 Bumpy Award (1 time)
 Tag Team of the Half-Year (2021) - with Dominik Mysterio
 Wrestling Observer Newsletter
 Best Flying Wrestler (1995–1997, 2002–2004)
 Best Wrestling Maneuver (1995) Flip dive into a frankensteiner on the floor
 Match of the Year (2002) with Edge vs. Chris Benoit and Kurt Angle, for the WWE Tag Team Championship, WWE No Mercy, October 20
 Most Outstanding Wrestler (1996)
 Rookie of the Year (1992)
 Worst Feud of the Year (2008) with Kane
 Wrestling Observer Newsletter Hall of Fame (Class of 2010)

Luchas de Apuestas record

Notes

References

External links 

 
 
  
 

1974 births
American male professional wrestlers
American professional wrestlers of Mexican descent
Catholics from California
Living people
Masked wrestlers
NWA/WCW/WWE United States Heavyweight Champions
People from Chula Vista, California
Professional wrestlers from California
The Latino World Order members
World Heavyweight Champions (WWE)
WWF/WWE Intercontinental Champions
WWE Champions
WWE Grand Slam champions
WWE Hall of Fame inductees
20th-century professional wrestlers
21st-century professional wrestlers
WCW/WWE Cruiserweight Champions
Mexican National Trios Champions
Lucha Underground Trios Champions
Ironman Heavymetalweight Champions
WCW World Tag Team Champions